Richard L. Dugger was Secretary of the Florida Department of Corrections from 1987 to 1991, when Harry K. Singletary, Jr. took over.

Dugger was warden of Florida State Prison from 1982 to 1987, when he was appointed Secretary of the Department of Corrections by then Florida Governor Bob Martinez. During his tenure, the Department started a large campaign to combat prison overcrowding.

Dugger was appointed deputy director of institutions for the Florida Department of Corrections in 1999, replacing Stan Czerniak, and in 2000, was appointed director of institutions for the Florida Department of Corrections.

Dugger was born in Jacksonville, Florida on January 25, 1943 and resided in Raiford, Florida until graduation from Bradford County High School in 1961. In his words, he became a "college drop-out" in 1964 and began his career with the Florida Department of Corrections as a Correctional Officer at Florida State Prison, East Unit. In 1966, he enlisted in the U.S. Army, 20th Special Forces to begin a military career lasting 20 years. 

Richard retired after a 30 year career in 1995. He returned to work for the Department of Corrections serving in various positions from 1999-2005 and again from 2006-2007.

Richard was equally proud of his military career. He had many stories about parachuting into various countries around the world. He was most proud of completing the Army Combat Diver Program in his 40s. He retired from the Army at the rank of Sergeant Major.   He died at the age of 72 in Tallahassee, Florida on August 20, 2015.

References

State cabinet secretaries of Florida
Year of birth missing (living people)
Living people
Florida State University alumni